Shibli Faraz is a Pakistani politician who served as the Minister of Science and Technology, in office  from 16 April 2021 to 10 April 2022. He has been a member of the Senate of Pakistan from Khyber Pakhtunkhwa since 2015.

Previously, Shibli had served as the Leader of the House for the Senate of Pakistan from 26 August 2018 until 4 June 2020. He is a senior member of Pakistan Tehreek-e-Insaf.

Early life
He's the son of the late Urdu poet Ahmad Faraz.

He completed his MA in International Relations at the University de Los Andes, Colombia in 1994.

Professional and political career
Faraz is an investment banker by profession and was a PIA commercial pilot and then a civil servant. He has contested the election for the Kohat District mayor in 2002 and his uncle Barrister Masood Kausar had served as the Governor of Khyber Pakhtunkhwa. He is the  son of poet Ahmad Faraz. His family is of Pashtun background.

In 2015 he was elected as a Senator under Pakistan Tehreek-e-Insaf for Khyber Pakhtunkhwa for a term until March 2021.

In August 2018, Prime Minister Imran Khan appointed Faraz as the Leader of the House for the Senate of Pakistan, where he served until 4 June 2020.

On 27 April 2020, Khan appointed Shibli as the Federal Minister for Information and Broadcasting along with General Asim Saleem Bajwa as Special Assistant to the Prime Minister for Information and Broadcasting.

20 September 2022 helicopter incident
Faraz was aboard a helicopter with Imran Khan and 2 others which was leaving Chakwal after a political rally by Imran Khan when the pilot of the plane fell ill. Faraz, a former pilot, took over and safely landed the helicopter.

See also

Imran Khan

References

Living people
People from Kohat District
Pakistan Tehreek-e-Insaf politicians
Pakistani senators (14th Parliament)
Year of birth missing (living people)
Pakistan Air Force officers
Hindkowan people
Information Ministers of Pakistan
Cadet College Kohat alumni